WRBI (103.9 FM) is a radio station broadcasting a Country format. Licensed to Batesville, Indiana, United States, it serves the Southeastern Indiana area. The station is currently owned by Leeson Media LLC (Brent Lee and Randy Lawson). Leeson purchased the station from White River Broadcasting Co., Inc. February 1, 2013.

External links
 

RBI